The one-and-a-half-stripe hap (Protomelas insignis)  is a species of cichlid endemic to Lake Malawi where it prefers rocky areas.  It is an egg-eater, seeking out and consuming the eggs of other fishes.  This species can reach a length of  TL.  It can also be found in the aquarium trade.

References

Protomelas
Fish described in 1935
Taxonomy articles created by Polbot